Vira is a given name. Notable people with the name include:

 Vira Ageyeva (born 1958), Ukrainian literary critic and philologist
 Vira Alakesvara of Gampola, king of Gampola
 Vira Bahu II of Gampola, king of Gampola
 Vira Chorny-Meshkova (born 1963), Ukrainian poet and translator
 Vira Jotava, Indian politician
 Vira Lozinsky (born 1974), Israeli-Moldovan musician and Yiddish language singer
 Vira Misevych (1945–1995), Soviet-Ukrainian equestrian 
 Vira Narasimha II (1220–1234), king of the Hoysala Empire
 Vira Ramanatha (1263–1295), king of the Hoysala Empire
 Vira Silenti (1931–2014), Italian actress 
 Vira Someshwara (1234–1263), king of the Hoysala Empire
 Vira Ulianchenko (born 1958), Ukrainian politician and activist
 Vira Ravi Ravi Varma (died 1504), raja of Venad
 Vira Varma, prince of Kottayam
 Vira Vovk (born 1926), Ukrainian-language writer, critic and translator 
 Vira Boarman Whitehouse (1875–1957), American suffragette, government official, and businessperson
 Vira Zozulya (born 1970), Ukrainian race walker